Touché is a German boy band famous from the mid- to late 1990s, created and produced by Dieter Bohlen (a member of Modern Talking), who wrote most of the music and lyrics and choreographed for the project.

The band performed in its original lineup until March 1999, when Karim Maataoui left following disagreement with other band members. He was replaced later that year by Stuart Fords. After unfruitful attempts to repeat the success of previous releases, Glenn and Dennis Frey decided to quit the band in 2001. They were replaced by Donny Weiss and Christopher Reuter. The new lineup released one single, "Can't Hurry Love" in 2002, and the group split a year later.

The band is best remembered for hits such as "This Goodbye Is Not Forever", "I'll Give You My Heart", and "I Can't Get No Sleep". Touché also heavily featured on the international hit single by The Bravo All Stars, "Let the Music Heal Your Soul".

The group was reunited in 2015 with Martin Scholz and Alexander Geist from the original lineup and two new members: Markus Klopfer and Pravit Anantapongse. Stuart and the Frey brothers were not invited back

Discography

Albums

Studio albums
 Part One (1997)
 Kids in America (1998)
 Another Part of Us (2000)

Compilation Album
 I'll Give You My Heart (2001)

Singles

References

External links
Touché official website
Touché fan site

German boy bands
Musical groups established in 1996
Musical groups disestablished in 2003
Musical groups reestablished in 2015